is the mayor of Okayama, Okayama in Japan. A graduate of Okayama Prefectural University-Junior College, he was first elected in October 2005.

References

See also
 Japanese Wikipedia entry on Okayama, Okayama. Retrieved on December 13, 2007.

1937 births
Living people
Mayors of places in Japan
People from Okayama